The Kingston Stakes is an American Thoroughbred horse race run annually during the second week of May at Belmont Park in Elmont, New York.  Restricted to horses bred in the State of New York, three years of age and older, it is contested on Turf over a distance of  a mile and a sixteenth (eight and a half furlongs).

Since inception in 1979, the Kingstom Handicap has been contested at various distances :
 1 Mile : 2010 to present
  miles : 1979–1986, 1988, 1994–1995, 2008–2009
  miles : 1991–1993, 1996–2007
  miles : 1987, 1989–1990

Inaugurated at Belmont Park in 1979 as the Kingston Handicap, it was run at Aqueduct Racetrack in 1980, 1983, and from 1986 through 1995.  the race is named in honor of U.S. Racing Hall of Fame inductee, Kingston The retrospective American Champion Older Male Horse of 1889 and 1890, Kingston's 89 wins is the most in the history of the sport of Thoroughbred horse racing. In addition to being an outstanding runner, Kingston was also the leading sire in North America in 1900 and 1910.

It was contested on dirt in 1980 and again in 1996 and was raced in two divisions in 1989.

Records
Speed  record:

Most wins:
 2 – Draw Shot (1997, 1998)
 2 – Pebo's Guy (1999, 2001)
 2 – Banrock (2008, 2009)

Most wins by an owner:
 2 – Francis Santangelo (1997, 1998)
 2 – Peter DeStefano (1999, 2001)
 2 – Nyala Farm (2008, 2009)

Most wins by a jockey:
 4 – Ángel Cordero Jr. (1981, 1983, 1984, 1990)

Most wins by a trainer:
 2 – Sidney Watters Jr. (1979, 1984)
 2 – Philip G. Johnson (1982, 1992)
 2 – Patrick J. Kelly (1986, 1994)
 2 – Barclay Tagg (1993, 2006)
 2 – Angel Penna Jr. (1997, 1998)
 2 – Thomas M. Bush (2008, 2009)
 2 – Christophe Clement (2002, 2015)

Winners

References
 The 2009 Kingston Stakes at ESPN

Turf races in the United States
Ungraded stakes races in the United States
Horse races in New York (state)
Belmont Park
Recurring sporting events established in 1979
1979 establishments in New York (state)